Doneraile GAA club is a Gaelic Athletic Association club located in Doneraile, County Cork, Ireland. The club fields teams in both hurling and Gaelic football. The club is a member of the Avondhu division of Cork GAA.

Achievements
 Cork Junior B Hurling Championship Winners (1) 2010
 North Cork Junior A Football Championship Winners (2) 1983, 1992  Runners-Up 1993, 1998, 2001
 North Cork Junior A Hurling Championship Winners (2) 1947, 1948  Runners-Up 1949, 1951, 1958

References

External sources
 Avondhu Divisional website

Gaelic games clubs in County Cork
Gaelic football clubs in County Cork
Hurling clubs in County Cork